Jérémy Chardy was the defending champion, but was no longer eligible to compete in the juniors.

Thiemo de Bakker defeated Marcin Gawron in the final, 6–2, 7–6(7–4) to win the boys' singles tennis title at the 2006 Wimbledon Championships.

Seeds

  Thiemo de Bakker (champion)
  Martin Kližan (first round)
  Donald Young (third round)
  Alexandre Sidorenko (first round)
  Nicolas Santos (first round)
  Luka Belić (quarterfinals)
  Petru-Alexandru Luncanu (third round)
  Sanam Singh (third round)
  Ivan Sergeyev (first round)
  Lee Hsin-han (third round)
  Sho Aida (first round)
  Artur Chernov (quarterfinals)
  Roman Jebavý (first round)
  Jeevan Nedunchezhiyan (first round)
  Robin Roshardt (quarterfinals)
  Daniel Dutra da Silva (second round)

Draw

Finals

Top half

Section 1

Section 2

Bottom half

Section 3

Section 4

References

External links

Boys' Singles
Wimbledon Championship by year – Boys' singles